Valentin Dumitru Suciu (born 25 September 1980) is a Romanian professional football manager. He was the manager of Sepsi OSK in the Liga I and FK Csíkszereda in the Liga II.

Honours

Coach
Sepsi OSK
Liga III: 2015–16
Liga IV – Covasna County: 2013–14

FK Csíkszereda
Liga III: 2018–19

References

External links
 

1980 births
Living people
People from Sfântu Gheorghe
Romanian football managers
Sepsi OSK Sfântu Gheorghe managers
FK Csíkszereda Miercurea Ciuc managers